A list of films produced in South Korea in 1963:

External links
1963 in South Korea

 1960-1969 at koreanfilm.org

South Korea
1963
Films